Augustus Frederick Burtwell (23 December 1894 – 16 November 1948) was an English actor, on stage from 1914, who featured in supporting roles in over 40 British films of the 1930s and 1940s.

Partial filmography

 Other People's Sins (1931)
 Down Our Street (1932)
 Just My Luck (1933)
 The Path of Glory (1934)
 Inside the Room (1935)
 Midshipman Easy (1935)
 This'll Make You Whistle (1936)
 Laburnum Grove (1936)
 Educated Evans (1936)
 Twelve Good Men (1936)
 The Vulture (1937)
 It's Not Cricket (1937)
 Doctor Syn (1937)
 Feather Your Nest (1937)
 French Leave (1937)
 Gypsy (1937)
 The Singing Cop (1938)
 I See Ice (1938)
 Penny Paradise (1938)
 Dangerous Medicine (1938)
 Everything Happens to Me (1938)
 A Girl Must Live (1939)
 Murder Will Out (1939)
 Confidential Lady (1939)
 His Brother's Keeper (1940)
 The Stars Look Down (1940)
 This Was Paris (1942)
 Much Too Shy (1942)
 The Silver Fleet (1943)
 We Dive at Dawn (1943)
 The Dark Tower (1943 film) (1943)
 I'll Be Your Sweetheart (1945)
 The Rake's Progress (1945)
 The Laughing Lady (1946)
 Gaiety George (1946)
 They Knew Mr. Knight (1946)
 Nicholas Nickleby (1947)
 Uncle Silas (1947)

References

External links
 
 Frederick Burtwell at BFI Film & TV Database

1894 births
1948 deaths
English male stage actors
English male film actors
Male actors from London
20th-century English male actors